William A. Ellenbogen (born December 8, 1950) is a former American football offensive lineman in the National Football League for the New York Giants. Prior to joining the Giants, he played with the Albany Metro Mallers and with two teams in the World Football League. He played college football at Virginia Tech.

References

1950 births
Living people
Players of American football from New York (state)
American football offensive tackles
American football offensive guards
Virginia Tech Hokies football players
New York Giants players
Sportspeople from Glen Cove, New York
New Rochelle High School alumni